La Bocana Roja Formation is a geological formation in Baja California, Mexico whose strata date back to the Late Cretaceous. Dinosaur remains are among the fossils that have been recovered from the formation.

Vertebrate paleofauna

See also

 List of dinosaur-bearing rock formations

Footnotes

References
 Hilton, Richard P. 2003. Dinosaurs and Other Mesozoic Reptiles of California. Berkeley: University of California Press. 318 pp.
 Weishampel, David B.; Dodson, Peter; and Osmólska, Halszka (eds.): The Dinosauria, 2nd, Berkeley: University of California Press. 861 pp. .

Paleontology in Mexico
Upper Cretaceous Series of North America